Hugo Markl (born December 6, 1964 in Pasadena, California) is a contemporary American artist, curator, and creative director.
He studied Visual communication at the University of Applied Arts Vienna (1985–90) where he graduated with an M.A. in fine arts. His practice spans a broad range of media including sculpture, photography, video, drawing, printmaking, installation art, and performance. Markl lives in New York City.

Work

"I imitate popular art that will not become popular art". With these words Hugo Markl has described his art, which feeds on the media imagery of consumer society, newspapers and porn websites, fashion magazines such as Vogue, logos of multinational corporations like FedEx, and even traffic signs, or objects charged with cultural and social connotations, such as the famous Winchester rifle. Markl deconstructs these symbols, or rather the relationship between the images and their referent, through collages, drawings, sculptures and installations that create a typical estrangement effect, creating a vision that looks both familiar and unknown. The artist sometimes combines references to low or vulgar culture with highbrow culture, as in the case of the IQ drawing series (2009), where the sign 'ROCK' is overlaid on the naked body of a woman, as a homage to conceptual artist Dan Graham-or the sign 'IKEA' is silhouetted against the reproduction of a famous edition of Horkheimer and Adorno's Dialectic of Enlightenment, the Bible for critics of consumer society and mass culture.

His work was widely reviewed by major international press outlets such as Art in America or the Neue Zürcher Zeitung. In his exhibition "Peter Builts" in 1997 at Galerie Walcheturm in Zurich he explored thoroughly and precisely the different facets of audio-visual impulses and how they influence contemporary body and mind. His work was compared to Richard Serra's minimal opulence as well as to Richard Prince's aesthetics, which cross the visual signs of everyday life with the insignia of art. This intersection of everyday life, pop culture, criticism and art is the base of his continuous exploration of aesthetic experience and the meaning of artistic creation nowadays.

In principle, he does not participate in-group exhibitions. However, Markl’s works are shown in-group exhibitions. For example, private art collectors lend their art to famous curators to organize public group exhibitions.

Exhibitions 

Markl's installations and sculptures have been exhibited in some solo exhibitions and some group exhibitions worldwide.
 
Selected exhibitions and projects:

Solo exhibitions

 2014 - La Gioia, Maison Particulière - Art Center, Brussels
 2012 - DITTRICH & SCHLECHTRIEM, SSSSS, Berlin
 2010 - Galerie Eva Presenhuber, "One day 1917, while his director was out sick with a hangover, John Ford made his first feature. ...", Zürich
 2009 - AMP Gallery, DR FRANKENSTEIN, Athens 
 2008 - Galerie Eva Presenhuber, Link, Zürich
 2007 - Galleria Raucci/Santamaria, MAMATSCHI, Naples
 2006 - Galerie Eva Presenhuber, BROWN, Zurich         - Galleria Raucci / Santamaria, SHRUG, Naples         - André Schlechtriem Temporary, CALCIUM, New York
 2003 - Gruppe Öesterreichische Guggenheim, PETER BUILTS OFFENE RECHNUNG, Vienna
1999 - Galerie Hauser & Wirth & Presenhuber, THE BIRTH OF peter builts AND THE DEATH OF hugo markl BECAUSE I NO LONGER AM I AM EVERYBODY I AM EVERYTHING, Zurich
 1998 - Galerie am Andechshof, Hugo Markl & Paloma / Installativ und Konzert, Innsbruck
 1997 - Galerie Walcheturm, Intolerance, Zurich         - Liste 97 the young art fair, Basel         - Galerie Walcheturm, Peter Builts, Zurich
 1996 - Austrian Institute, NOSTALHU, London 
 1995 - ACME studios for the artists, superapologize 60 min., (major support by the Austrian institute, London), London
 1994 - Galerie Walcheturm, Hugo Markl, Gudrun Enslin, Zurich         - Centre d' Art Contemporain, PASSAT, Martigny
 1992 - Galerie Walcheturm, Hugo Markl, Zurich
 1991 - Shedhalle, Manum de tabula, Zurich
 1989 - Pinx Galerie, SHIRT, Vienna
 1987 - Universität für Angewandte Kunst, Kieltrunk, Vienna

Group exhibitions

 2016 - They printed it!, Kunsthalle Zürich, Zurich
 2014 - La Gioia, Maison Particulière - Art Center, Brussels
 2012 - Un‘espressione geografica, Curated by Francesco Bonami, Fondazione Sandretto Re Rebaudengo, Turin, Italy
 2010 | 2011 - PLUS ULTRA, Works from the Sandretto Re Rebaudengo Collection. Curator Francesco Bonami, MACRO Testaccio, Museo D'Arte Contemporanea, Rome, Italy
 2010 - Haus für Kunst Uri, Edition 5, Erstfeld, Switzerland
 2009 - Hamburger Bahnhof + Flick Collection, DIE KUNST IST SUPER!, Berlin           - Galerie Patrick Seguin invites Galerie Eva Presenhuber, We Are Sun-kissed and Snow-blind, Paris          - Burger Collection, CONFLICTING TALES, Berlin
 2008 - Gladstone Gallery, No Information Available, curated by Francesco Bonami, Brussels          - Porta di Sant' Agostino, Stultifera Navis, curated by A. Bruciati and M. Tagliafierro, Bergamo, Italy 
 2007 - Yvon Lambert Gallery, Mario Testino‚ At Home, a selection of works chosen and installed by Mario Testino', New York          - House Eva Presenhuber, Jubilee Exhibition, Vnà, Switzerland          - Palais de Tokyo, The Third Mind, curated by Ugo Rondinone, Paris
 2005 - Nicole Klagsbrun Gallery, INTERSTATE, (curator Adam McEwen), New York
 2004 - Gruppe Öesterreichische Guggenheim, Kunstverein, ALICE LAENG ZBINDEN und MAX MUSCHER-FÜR GELD MACHEN SIE ALLES, Vienna
 2003 - Tiroler Landesmuseum Ferdinandeum, Innsbruck          - Galerie Hauser & Wirth & Presenhuber, BREATHING THE WATER, (curator Ugo Rondinone), Zurich          - Gruppe Öesterreichische Guggenheim, Kunstverein, GLÜHWEIN + KESCHTN – Lavuapappn, Vienna
 2000 - Sammlung Hauser und Wirth, The Oldest Possible Memory, Lokremise, St. Gallen
 1998 - Museum Moderner Kunst, Stiftung Ludwig, 20 Haus, Die Sammlung, Vienna
 1996 - Artothek im Parlamentsgebäude, Ausstellung 96, (curator Notburga Coronabless), Vienna          - Kunsthaus Zürich, Wunderkammer Öesterreich, (curator Harald Szeemann), Zurich          - MAK – Museum für Angewandte Kunst, Austria im Rosennetz, (curator Harald Szeemann), Vienna          - Museum Moderner Kunst, Stiftung Ludwig, Coming up, Vienna          - Galerie im Taxispalais, Innsbruck
 1995 - Fondazione Querini, Lokalzeit – Wiener Material im Spiegel des Unbehagens, (curator Peter Weibel), Venice          - Karin Kilimnik, Galerie Walcheturm, window display by Hugo Markl, no face entertainment row, Zurich          - ACME studios for the artists, superapologize 60 min., (major support by the Austrian institute, London), London 
 1994 - Galerie Walcheturm, Eine Galerie stellt sich vor,  Galerie im Taxispalais, Innsbruck          - Museum und Galerie Moderner Kunst Laibach, Lokalzeit – Wiener Material im Spiegel des Unbehagens, (curator Peter Weibel), Laibach / SLO          - Kunstraum Strohal, Lokalzeit – Wiener Material im Spiegel des Unbehagens, (curator Peter Weibel), Vienna          - Galerie im Taxispalais, Art Tirol, (curator Magdalena Hörmann), Innsbruck          - Galerie Walcheturm, Passing Through, group show, (curator Ugo Rondinone), Zurich
 1993 - Centre d' Art Contemporain Martigny, (curator Stefano Germini), Martigny
 1991 - Shedhalle, Manum de tabula, Zurich          - Men, Group Show, Galerie Walcheturm, Zurich          - Shedhalle, STILLSTAND switches, Zurich
 1990 - Group Show, Galerie Walcheturm, Zurich            - Galerie Zeitkunst, Aus der Nähe. Aus der Ferne., Innsbruck
 1989 - Secession, Junge Szene Wien, Vienna          - Öesterreichisches Museum des 21. Jahrhunderts, (curator Oswald Oberhuber), Vienna
 1988 - Galerie Grita Insam, Akte der Beschreibung, (curator Helmut Draxler), Vienna          - Galerie Zeitkunst, Innsbruck          -Galerie Knoll, Drucke, Vienna

Collections

Private collections 

 Fondazione Sandretto Re Rebaudengo, Turin, Italy
 Burger Collection, Hong Kong, China
 Friedrich Christian Flick Collection, Hamburger Bahnhof, Berlin, Germany
 MUMOK Museum Moderner Kunst Stiftung Ludwig, Vienna, Austria
 Pomeranz Collection, Vienna, Austria
 Andreas Züst († 2000) Collection, Switzerland
 Joel Wachs, President of the Andy Warhol Foundation, New York, N.Y.
 Shane Akeroyd, Executive Vice President at Markit, London, U.K.
 Claude Berri († 2009), Paris, France
 Sofia Coppola, New York, N.Y., and Paris, France
 Urs Fischer, New York, N.Y.
 Ugo Rondinone, New York, N.Y.
 Mario Testino Art Projects at Home, Paris, France, and New York, N.Y.
 David Teiger († 2014), New York, N.Y.
 Hauser & Wirth, Zurich, Switzerland
 Eva Presenhuber, Zurich, Switzerland

Public collections 

 Mead Art Museum at Amherst College
 Hampshire College Art Gallery
 Historic Deerfield
 Mount Holyoke College Art Museum
 The Joseph Allen Skinner Museum at Mount Holyoke College
 Smith College Museum of Art
 University Museum of Contemporary Art at UMASS Amherst

Art market 

Markl was represented by Galerie Walcheturm, Zurich; Galerie Hauser & Wirth & Presenhuber, Zurich; Galerie Eva Presenhuber, Zurich; Galleria Raucci/Santamaria, Naples; André Schlechtriem Contemporary, New York; AMP Gallery, Athens. He's currently represented by DITTRICH & SCHLECHTRIEM, Berlin.

Personal life 
Markl has two daughters: Adah and Hannah. For a period in the 2010s, Markl gave up business to be a stay-at-home dad to his children.

Between 2006 and 2008, Markl made approximately $12 million, solely from income as an advertising consultant for [MNCs] multinational corporations.

Markl's business relationship with three galleries ended abruptly in 2010, he says, the main reason for the mutual break off of the relations was the imbalance of power in these relationships (In reference to the last global financial crisis of 2008–2012).

References

Further reading
Folio Publications
DITTRICH & SCHLECHTRIEM
Maison Particulière
They Printed It! A project by Kunsthalle Zürich

External links 
 Personal website
 DITTRICH & SCHLECHTRIEM, Berlin

American artists
1964 births
Living people
University of Applied Arts Vienna alumni